Bhai Kanhaiya (1648–1718) was a Sikh of Guru Tegh Bahadur Ji and was requested to establish the Sevapanthi or Addanshahi order of the Sikhs by Guru Gobind Singh Ji. He was known for pouring water for all the wounded members of the battlefield no matter whether they were Sikhs or fighting against the Sikhs.

During his youth he also spent a lot of time in the company of Nanua Bairagi, who belonged to a Saini agriculture family  and was also a disciple and comrade of last three Sikh gurus. Nanua Bairagi was a renowned poet-mystic of Punjab and he left a deep imprint on Bhai Kanhaiya's spiritual and humanitarian outlook in his formative years.

He was also the founder of the Sevapanthi Sikh Sampradaya.

References

Further reading

External links 
 www.khalsaaid.org
 www.bhaikanhaiyaji.com
 www.sewapanthi.org
 www.sikhpoint.com
 www.unitedsikhs.org
 By B Singh
 www.studentbmj.com
 members.dancris.com
 www.sikhnn.com/

Indian Sikhs
1648 births
1718 deaths
Sikh saints